Cabin Porn may refer to:

 Cabin Porn (book), a 2015 photo-book by Zach Klein
 Cabin Porn, a song by Momus from the 2016 album Scobberlotchers